The murder of Amanda Milan took place on June 20, 2000, when two men killed Milan, a 25-year-old trans woman, in the street near the Port Authority Bus Terminal in New York City. The event provoked outrage within the transgender community, has been remembered in public demonstrations, and discussed in print.

Murder
At 4 a.m. on June 20, Milan was walking to catch a cab after leaving a group of friends at the bus terminal when, according to witnesses, a man, later identified as Dwayne McCuller, walked up to her and began to harass and threaten her. Milan stood up to him and asked him if he wanted to fight. According to police reports, he threatened to shoot and punch her. Witnesses said she declined. As she walked away, another young man, Eugene Celestine, told McCuller that he had a knife. McCuller grabbed it, and stabbed her in the neck. 
A man named David Anderson allegedly helped McCuller escape from the scene.

A passerby attempted to stop the bleeding and an ambulance arrived to take Milan to the hospital; however, despite their attempts, she died in less than an hour at St. Vincent's Hospital.

Reaction 
The murder took place days before the annual LGBT pride parade. Transgender activist Sylvia Rivera worked towards seeing that Milan's death was investigated and organized Milan's political funeral along with other demonstrations claiming a disconnection of transgender rights from the larger LGBT communities. According to queer activist and author Mattilda Bernstein Sycamore "Milan came to symbolize the unfinished business of an LGBT movement that had all too often, 'left transgender people in the back of the bus.'" Because of Milan's murder Rivera reformed a transgender activist group, Street Trans Activist Revolutionaries (STAR). Rivera  cited the crime amongst the reasons to add a broad definition of gender to the New York City Human Rights Law.

Long-time trans activist Melissa Schlarz explained that since the mid-1970s, she had read about trans women being murdered in Times Square, but "what makes the Milan case significant is that until Amanda Milan no one responded." Schlarz said that usually the newspapers were "dropping hints of transpanic" ambiguously. Schlarz concluded that "Milan has become not a martyr, but a rallying cry. The activism around her death showed the world transgender people belong in the queer community – the message from activists is that there is no difference between Matthew Shephard and Amanda Milan. The response to her death tells the non-queer community: enough, today the violence stops."

According to Benjamin Heim Shepard in Amanda Milan and The Rebirth of Street Trans Activist Revolutionaries the case and the resulting media attention helped "galvanize the transgender community and instigated change".

Aftermath 
McCuller was indicted for murder in the second degree. He subsequently pleaded guilty and was sentenced to seventeen and a half years to life in prison.

Anderson was indicted for hindering prosecution in the first degree, and Celestine was indicted for one count each of criminally negligent homicide, criminal facilitation in the fourth degree and criminal possession of a weapon in the fourth degree.

See also
 Murder of Gwen Araujo
 Trans-bashing
 Transgender Day of Remembrance
 Transphobia

References

2000 murders in the United States
2000 in New York City
2000 in LGBT history
Violence against trans women
June 2000 events in the United States
June 2000 crimes
Deaths by stabbing in New York (state)
People murdered in New York City
Deaths by person in New York City
Female murder victims
American victims of anti-LGBT hate crimes
Women in New York City